The 2022 Pan American Track Cycling Championships took place at the National Sports Village (VIDENA) velodrome in Lima, Peru from 10 to 14 August 2022.

Medal summary

Men

Women

Medal table

References

External links
Results

Pan American Road and Track Championships
Americas
Cycling
International sports competitions hosted by Peru
Sports competitions in Lima
Pan American Track Cycling